The WAFF Beach Soccer Championship is an international beach soccer competition contested by West Asian men's national teams who are members of the West Asian Football Federation (WAFF).

First held in 2013, the inaugural event is the only edition to have been held thus far. However, in 2021, WAFF announced a second edition would take place with a view to making the championship an annual occurrence.

Results

See also
AFC Beach Soccer Asian Cup
AFF Beach Soccer Championship
WAFF Futsal Championship

External links
 West Asian Football Federation, official website

References 

Beach soccer competitions
WAFF competitions